The mandibular incisive canal is a bony canal within the anterior mandible that runs bilaterally from the mental foramina usually to the region of the ipsilateral lateral incisor teeth. After branching into the mental nerve that exits the foramen of the same name, the inferior alveolar nerve continues anteriorly within the mandibular incisive canal as the incisive nerve, providing innervation to the mandibular first premolar, canine and lateral and central incisors.  The mandibular incisive nerve either terminates as nerve endings within the anterior teeth or adjacent bone, or may join nerve endings that enter through the tiny lingual foramen.

The incisive canal is typically found within the middle third of the mandible in an apico-coronal dimension, reaching the midline 18% of the time.

See also
 Maxillary incisive canal

References

Bones of the head and neck